The 1994 Asian Junior Women's Volleyball Championship was held in Manila, Philippines

Results

|}

Final standing

References
Results (Archived 2014-10-15)

A
V
Asian women's volleyball championships
Asian Junior